The 2017–18 BFA Senior League is the 27th season of the Bahamas top-flight football league. The season began on 29 October 2017 and ended on 22 April 2018.

Teams

Stadia and locations

Standings

References

External links
Bahamas Football Association

BFA Senior League seasons
Bahamas
BFA Senior League
BFA Senior League